The Christ Hospital is a 555-bed, not-for-profit acute care facility in Cincinnati, Ohio, offering services in cardiovascular care, spine treatment, women's health, major surgery, cancer, behavioral medicine, orthopaedics, emergency care, kidney transplant and others. The Christ Hospital is consistently recognized by U.S. News & World Report as one of the nation's top 50 hospitals in several categories.

The hospital's location, at one of the highest points in Hamilton County, affords a panoramic view of the Cincinnati basin below. It is sometimes considered to be part of the Pill Hill neighborhood.

References

External links
Christ Hospital construction images

Hospitals in Cincinnati
1889 establishments in Ohio
Hospitals established in 1889
University of Cincinnati
Mount Auburn, Cincinnati